The George Washington Colonials baseball team is a varsity intercollegiate athletic team of George Washington University in Washington, DC, United States. The team is a member of the Atlantic 10 Conference, which is part of the National Collegiate Athletic Association's Division I. George Washington's first baseball team was fielded in 1891. The team plays its home games at Barcroft Park in Arlington, Virginia. The Colonials are coached by Gregg Ritchie.

History
The George Washington University has won eight total conference championships since sponsoring a program. The program has had 43 players drafted since its inception.

Barcroft Park in Arlington, Va., has been the home of GW baseball since the team relocated off The Ellipse in 1993. The facility underwent a multimillion-dollar renovation in 2012 to install a new press box, concession area, dugouts, bullpens and stadium seating.

In 2014, Ave Tucker, an alumnus and former center fielder, donated $2 million. The name of the facility was officially changed to Tucker Field in his honor. He graduated in 1977 from the George Washington University School of Business.

All-time Coaching Records
The Colonials have had 12 coaches since 1950 when proper records were kept. The coach with the most all-time wins is Tom Walter with 275.

Year-by-year Home Results
The following is the home record of the Colonials since they relocated to Tucker Field.

Colonial Hall of Fame
Samuel Tong

See also
List of NCAA Division I baseball programs

References

External links
 

 
Baseball teams established in 1891
1891 establishments in Washington, D.C.